Peter Theodor Holst (7 December 1843 - 9 January 1908) was a Norwegian politician for the Liberal Party. He was Minister of Defence 1891–1893 and 1898–1900. Holst was an officer by profession, and was made Major General in 1899.

References

1843 births
1908 deaths
Defence ministers of Norway